General Sir Anthony Blaxland Stransham  (22 December 1805 – 6 October 1900) was a senior officer in the Royal Marines.

Background
Stransham was the son of Lieutenant Colonel Anthony Stransham of the Royal Marines, and grandson of Major Samuel Stransham, also of the Royal Marines, who raised the Union Flag on the Falklands in 1771, claiming formal possession of the islands for the United Kingdom.

Military career
Stransham entered the Royal Marines on 1 January 1823. Four years after entering the service, he was present as a subaltern at the Battle of Navarino on 20 October 1827. Stransham led the Royal Marines during the First Battle of Canton in the First Opium War on 18 March 1841. He was wounded and promoted to captain. He was awarded the Baltic Medal, having been with Charles John Napier in 1854. From 1862 to 1867, General Stransham was Inspector-General of the Royal Marines.

Later in his career, as a general, the "Grand Old Man of the Army" became a Knight Grand Cross of the Order of the Bath.

He saw active service for over 53 years, retiring with the rank of general on 24 December 1875.

References

1805 births
1900 deaths
British military personnel of the First Opium War
Knights Grand Cross of the Order of the Bath
British military personnel of the Greek War of Independence
Royal Marines generals
Royal Navy personnel of the Crimean War
Military personnel from Norfolk
People from North Norfolk (district)